Asota javana is a moth of the family Erebidae first described by Pieter Cramer in 1780. It is found in Sundaland, the Philippines, Sulawesi and on Sula Island.

The wingspan is 57–68 mm.

Subspecies
Asota javana celebensis (Sulawesi)
Asota javana deliana (Sumatra)
Asota javana flaviventris (Seram, Sulawesi, Philippines)
Asota javana javana (Borneo, Boeton, Java, Sulawesi, Myanmar)

External links

Zwier, Jaap. "Asota javana javana Cramer 1780". Aganainae (Snouted Tigers). Retrieved August 5, 2019.

Asota (moth)
Moths of Asia
Moths described in 1780